Fujiwara no Nakafumi (also Nakafun, 923–992, Japanese: 藤原 仲文) was a middle Heian waka poet and Japanese nobleman. He was designated a member of the Thirty-six Poetry Immortals.

Nakafumi's poems are included in several imperial poetry anthologies, including Chokusen Wakashū. A personal poetry collection known as the Nakafumishū also remains.

Notes

External links 
E-text of his poems in Japanese

923 births
992 deaths
Fujiwara clan
10th-century Japanese poets